Ibone Lallana del Rio (born 15 May 1976) is a Spanish Taekwondo practitioner, born in Basauri. 

She won a silver medal in middleweight at the 1999 World Taekwondo Championships, and a bronze medal in welterweight at the 2005 World Taekwondo Championships. She won a silver medal at the 2004 European Taekwondo Championships.

Notes

References

External links
 
 

1976 births 
Living people
People from Basauri
Spanish female taekwondo practitioners
World Taekwondo Championships medalists
Sportspeople from Biscay
European Taekwondo Championships medalists
20th-century Spanish women
21st-century Spanish women